Scott Reed (born 1970) is an American illustrator, comic book artist and author from Reedsville, Ohio. His earliest comic work as a writer and inker appeared in Silverwolf Comics (Greater Mercury Comics) Eradicators in 1990. In 1993, he worked on-staff as an inker for Malibu Comics until 1996, when he was hired by Dark Horse Comics to provide inks for Godzilla and G.I. Joe Extreme comic book mini-series. For the next several years, he produced creator-owned online comics under his self-publishing label Webs Best Comics. In 2007, he and artist Shane White collaborated on The Overman, an apocalyptic noir science fiction mini-series published by Image Comics. In 2010, Reed wrote two mini-series for Marvel Comics, Realm of Kings: Son of Hulk, and Incredible Hulks: Enigma Force, which re-introduced several Microverse characters into the Marvel Universe. Both series were penciled by Miguel Munera. In 2012, Reed wrote, illustrated and published Saga Of A Doomed Universe, a graphic novel distributed digitally with Comixology and included in Boing-Boing's 'Best Damn Comics of the Year' of 2012. From 2016-2018, Reed worked as a colorist on MidWalker, a comic book mini-series published by Fierce Comics. The first issue of Reed's latest comic book mini-series, Hark, was published in 2020 under his creator-owned label Beyond Forward Comics and distributed by Comixology and IndyPlanet.

Bibliography
 Reed, Scott. The Last Odyssey 2003 Lulu.com. 
 Reed, Scott. High Strangeness 2005 Lulu.com. 
 Reed, Scott. The Overman 2009 Image Comics. 
 Reed, Scott. Realm Of Kings 2010 Marvel Comics. 
 Reed, Scott. Incredible Hulks: Enigma Force 2011 Marvel Comics. 
 Reed, Scott. Saga Of A Doomed Universe 2012 Comixology. 
 Reed, Scott. Hark 2020 Comixology. 
 Reed, Scott. Hark 2020 IndyPlanet.

Interviews
 Matthew McLean at Comics Bulletin about The Overman 
 Zack Smith at Newsarama about Realm of Kings: Son of Hulk 
 Kiel Phegley at Comic Book Resources about Hiro-Kala Incredible Hulks: Dark Son 
 George Marston at Newsarama about Incredible Hulks: Enigma Force

Reviews
 Harry Jay Knowles at Ain't It Cool News about The Overman 
 Tonya Crawford at Broken Frontier about The Overman 
 Jesse Schedeen at IGN about Realm Of Kings: Son Of Hulk 
 George Marston at Newsarama about Saga Of A Doomed Universe 
 Brian Heater at Boing Boing about Saga Of A Doomed Universe

External links
 —Professional
 
Saga Of A Doomed Universe

1970 births
Living people
People from Vienna, West Virginia
American comics writers
American comics artists
American cartoonists